The Große Deutsche Kunstausstellung (Great German Art Exhibition) was held a total of eight times from 1937 to 1944 in the purpose-built Haus der Deutschen Kunst in Munich. It was representative of art under National Socialism.

History 

The Great German Art Exhibition, which spanned the first floor, the upper floor and the two-story "Hall of Honour" in the centre of the building, was promoted as the most important cultural event in National Socialist Germany. The show was conceived as a sales exhibition; artists could be represented with several works (usually up to ten works), and sometimes non-saleable works, such as loans, were also exhibited. During each exhibition, a "special show" gave a selected artist the opportunity to present himself more comprehensively.

While the organizational and technical part of the exhibition preparation was the responsibility of the "Haus der Deutschen Kunst (Neuer Glaspalast)" as an institution under public law, the overall artistic direction was in the hands of a "Commissioner of the President of the Reichskammer of Fine Arts", appointed by Adolf Hitler, his photographer Heinrich Hoffmann.

The duration of the exhibitions was fixed from the beginning until 1940; the later exhibitions were announced "until further notice". The exhibitions were open daily - including Sundays and holidays - from 9 am to 6 pm. Works sold during the exhibition could be replaced by others "found to be in good condition when the works were examined." The Haus der Deutschen Kunst was the sole contracting party in the sale. Photographing and copying of exhibited works was initially not permitted during exhibition hours. From 1943, however, this was possible for press purposes with the prior consent of the exhibition management.

The "Great German Art Exhibition" was ceremonially opened on July 18, 1937, together with the "House of German Art" building. In the opening speech, Hitler gave a comprehensive presentation of the National Socialist understanding of "German art," which would be the only art permitted in public in the future. In doing so, Hitler outlined, according to Stefan Schweizer, a fundamental, völkisch-racist  structure of historical and art historical ideas and interpretations. With his idea that art was a direct expression of the circumstances of the time that shaped it, he identified the art of the Weimar Republic with the political system of the time. The art he valued, on the other hand, he saw as legitimized by politics and at the same time as legitimizing politics. He defined the new German art stylistically as well as ideologically with the words, "'To be German is to be clear.' But that would mean that to be German is to be logical and, above all, true."

In contrast, Hitler defamed "modern art," which was "degenerate," and announced:  As an example of the now ostracized art, the "Degenerate Art" exhibition in Munich's Hofgarten began one day later. The "Great German Art Exhibition" showed a total of 12,550 exhibits and was visited by around 600,000 people. Art for 13 million Reichsmarks was sold; Hitler alone bought works for 6.8 million Reichsmarks. International interest remained low.

After 1945, numerous works were no longer shown and were also no longer reproduced. The Zentralinstitut für Kunstgeschichte München - in cooperation with the Haus der Kunst, Munich and the Deutsches Historisches Museum, Berlin - has been making them accessible online since October 2011 to facilitate a social and art historical debate. Parallel to the online project, a complete directory of the artists of the Great German Art Exhibition from 1937 to 1944 was published by Neuhaus Verlag in Berlin.

{{Gallery
| title = Procession for the opening on 18 July 1937
| align        = center
| footer       = 
| style        =
| state        = 
| height       =
| width        =
| captionstyle =
|File:Festzug_M%C3%BCnchen_18_Juli_1937_Bild1.jpg|alt1=|caption
|File:Festzug_M%C3%BCnchen_18_Juli_1937_Bild2.jpg|alt2=|The photo series was taken from a grandstand at Odeonsplatz (east side), diagonally opposite the "Führer-Tribüne" (seen here)
|File:Festzug_M%C3%BCnchen_18_Juli_1937_Bild3.jpg|alt3=|Flag bearers rode at the head of a 3 km long procession.
|File:Festzug_M%C3%BCnchen_18_Juli_1937_Bild4.jpg|alt4=|Es wirkten mit 26 Wagen, 5000 Kostüme, 450 Reiter
|File:Festzug_M%C3%BCnchen_18_Juli_1937_Bild5.jpg|alt5=|Gezeigt wurde ein Bilderbogen von der germanischen Zeit über Römerzeit, Gotik, Renaissance, Barock, Rokoko bis zur Neuzeit.
|File:Festzug_M%C3%BCnchen_18_Juli_1937_Bild6.jpg|alt6=|There were 26 wagons, 5000 costumes, 450 riders.
|File:Festzug_M%C3%BCnchen_18_Juli_1937_Bild7.jpg|alt7=|
|File:Festzug_M%C3%BCnchen_18_Juli_1937_Bild8.jpg|alt8=|
|File:Festzug_M%C3%BCnchen_18_Juli_1937_Bild9.jpg|alt9=|
|File:Festzug_M%C3%BCnchen_18_Juli_1937_Bild10.jpg|alt10=| The parade was a highlight of the Day of German Art//.

}}

 Exhibitions 

 1937: First editions from July 18 to October 31. Opening within the framework of a Day of German Art with a festive program from July 16 to 18, including a large procession 2000 Years of German Culture". Simultaneous opening of the new House of German Art. Opening speech by Adolf Hitler.
 1938: Second edition from July 10 to October 16. 1158 works of art. Special exhibition of 21 works by Werner Peiner, Kronenburg. May 21 to June 26, 1938: Special exhibition Small Collections, Painting - Sculpture - Prints.
 1939: Third edition from July 16 to October 15. Opening in the framework of a two-day Day of German Art.
 1940: Fourth edition from July 27. 1397 works by 752 artists. Opening by the Minister of Propaganda, Joseph Goebbels. In mid-October 1940, the sold works were exchanged for 317 additional selected works. The exhibition was to remain open until February 1941.
 1941: Fifth edition from July 26. Duration: "Until further notice". 1347 works by 647 artists. Opening by Goebbels. Special exhibition of 27 works by Raffael Schuster-Woldan, Berlin.
 1942: Sixth edition from July 4. Duration: "Until further notice". 1213 works by 680 artists. Opening by Goebbels.
 1943: Seventh edition from 26 June. Duration: "Until further notice".  1141 works by 660 artists. Opening by Goebbels. Special show of 35 works by   Peter Philippi, Rothenburg ob der Tauber.
 1944: Eighth edition from July. Dauer: „Duration: "Until further notice".

 Exhibiting artists (selection) 
 Painting and printmaking 

 Richard Albitz (1942, 1943)
 Erhard Astler (1939, 1940, 1944)
 Thomas Baumgartner
 Claus Bergen
 Max Bergmann
 Alexander Bertrand (1937)
 Wilhelm Brandenberg (1938, 1941–1943)
 Lothar-Günther Buchheim (1941–1943)
 Paul Beuttner (1944)
 Carl Cohnen (1939, 1943–1944)
 Reinhold Dieffenbacher (1941, 1942)
 Hermann Dietze (1937–1944)
 Otto Diez
 Elk Eber
 Franz Eichhorst
 Otto Engelhardt-Kyffhäuser (1940)
 Fritz Erler
 Erich Feyerabend (1937-1944)
 Alfred Finsterer
 Peter Foerster
 Franz Frankl (1937, 1938)
 Karl Gatermann der Ältere (1938, 1942)
 Constantin Gerhardinger
 Franz Sales Gebhardt-Westerbuchberg
 Franz Gerwin
 Hermann Gradl
 Oskar Graf
 Georg Günther
 Willy Habl
 Anton Hackenbroich (1937, 1939, 1940, 1944)
 Christian Hacker (1937)
 Emilie von Hallavanya (1937,1938,1941–1944)
 Willy Hanft
 Karl Hanusch (1938)
 Paul Adolf Hauptmann
 Otto Hederich (1938)
 Walter Hemming
 Wilhelm Hempfing
 Josef Hengge (1941–1944)
 Sepp Hilz
 Conrad Hommel
 Curt Hoppe-Camphausen (1943)
 Carl Horn
 Hermann Otto Hoyer
 Arthur Illies (1941–1944)
 Angelo Jank
 Karl Julius Joest (1941–1943)
 Julius Paul Junghanns
 Arthur Kampf (1939)
 Herbert Kampf (1939–1943)
 Hermann Kaspar
 Josef Katzola (1938)
 Josef Woldemar Keller-Kühne
 Franz Kienmayer (1937)
 Erich Kips
 Otto Kirchner
 Richard Klein
 Walther Klemm (1937–1944)
 Johann Kluska (1941)
 Heinrich Knirr
 Fred Kocks (1942, 1943)
 Leo Küppers (1942)
 Anton Kürmaier (1937–1943)
 Georg Sluyterman von Langeweyde (1939, 1940)
 Hubert Lanzinger
 Jan Laß (1942)
 Karl Lenz (1937–1942)
 Rudolf Lipus
 Georg Lebrecht
 Hans Jacob Mann
 Oskar Martin-Amorbach
 Hermann Mayrhofer-Passau (1937–1944)
 Erich Mercker
 Herbert Molwitz (1937–1944)
 Bernhard Müller
 Hans Müller-Schnuttenbach
 Oskar Mulley
 Willy Mulot (1938)
 Oskar Nerlinger
 Leo Nyssen (1941)
 Adolf Obst (1941)
 Paul Mathias Padua
 Willy Paupie
 Alfons Peerboom (1939, 1940)
 Werner Peiner
 Conrad Pfau
 Peter Philippi
 Meta Plückebaum (1939)
 Leo Poeten (1943)
 Hans von Poschinger
 Carl Theodor Protzen
 Erwin Puchinger
 Robert Pudlich
 Albert Reich (1938, 1939, 1942)
 August Rixen (1937, 1941–1944)
 Karl Rössing (1939, 1940)
 Paul Roloff (1937)
 Toni Roth (1937–1943)
 Ivo Saliger
 Leo Samberger
 Wilhelm Sauter
 Leopold Schmutzler
 Toni Schönecker (1940)
 Wilhelm Schmidthild
 Hans Schmitz-Wiedenbrück
 Josef Schröder-Schoenenberg
 Raffael Schuster-Woldan
 Richard Schwarzkopf (1937)
 Georg Siebert
 Felix Skoda (1943)
 Albert Spethmann (1942)
 Hans Spiegel (1939, 1944)
 Ferdinand Spiegel
 Blasius Spreng (1942)
 Franz Xaver Stahl
 Josef Steiner (1941, 1942)
 Karl Storch
 Otto Thämer
 Hermann Tiebert
 Hans Toepper (1937, 1939, 1940)
 Franz Triebsch
 Will Tschech (1939, 1942)
 Ernst Unbehauen (1943)
 Franz Xaver Unterseher (1937, 1940–1942)
 Josef Wahl (1937–1943)
 Karl Walther
 Franz Weiß (1939, 1940, 1942–1944)
 Rudolf G. Werner
 Paul Westerfrölke
 Erwin Wilking (1942, 1943)
 Wolfgang Willrich
 Otto Winkelsträter
 Adolf Wissel
 Ludwig Wollenheit (1943, 1944)
 Adolf Ziegler
 Bodo Zimmermann
 Heinrich von Zügel

Sculpture 

 Fritz Behn
 Rudolf Belling (1937)
 August Bischoff
 Bernhard Bleeker
 Hermann Brachert
 Arno Breker
 Lothar Dietz
 Max Esser
 Fritz von Graevenitz (1937, 1940–1943)
 Theobald Hauck (1938)
 G. Adh. Hedblom
 Karl Hoefelmayr (1939)
 Artur von Hüls
 Carl Paul Jennewein (1937, 1938, 1939)
 Barbara von Kalckreuth
 Lilli Kerzinger-Werth (1937, 1938, 1940, 1943, 1944)
 Fritz Klimsch
 Fritz Koelle
 Georg Kolbe
 Wilhelm Krieger
 Walter Kruse (1939, 1940, 1944)
 Leon Lauffs (1938)
 Adolf Lesnick (1937, 1939)
 Ferdinand Liebermann
 Paul Merling (1939, 1940, 1942, 1943)
 Hermann Joachim Pagels
 Clemens Pasch
 Bernhard von Plettenberg
 Charlotte Reischauer
 Ernst Reiß-Schmidt
 Konrad Roth
 Richard Scheibe
 Hans Schwegerle
 Wilhelm Srb-Schloßbauer (1944)
 Milly Steger (1937)
 Carl Stock
 Wilhelm Tank
 Josef Thorak
 Oscar E. Ulmer (1941)
 Hermann Volz
 Josef Wackerle
 Adolf Wamper
 Wilhelm Wandschneider
 Walther Wolff (1939, 1942)
 Rudolf Zieseniss (1941)
 Alfred Zschorsch (1940)
 Walter Zschorsch (1940)

 Bibliography 

 Große Deutsche Kunstausstellung (Jahresangabe) im Haus der Deutschen Kunst zu München. Offizieller Ausstellungskatalog. Knorr & Hirth / F. Bruckmann KG, München 1937–1944. (Verzeichnis der Kunstwerke und Abbildungsteil; Abbildungen erfolgten in Auswahl). Teilweise erschienen zu den Katalogen Ergänzungsteile mit der Auflistung ausgetauschter Werke.
 Kunst im 3. Reich – Dokumente der Unterwerfung. Frankfurter Kunstverein u. Arbeitsgruppe d. Kunstgeschichtlichen Instituts d. Universität Frankfurt im Auftrag d. Stadt Frankfurt, Frankfurt am Main 1980. (Diesem Taschenbuch liegt ein Ausstellungskatalog zu Grunde.)
 
 Sabine Brantl: Große Deutsche Kunstausstellungen. 1937–1944. In: Deutschland Archiv (Hrsg.): Drittes Reich. Dokumente.'' Braunschweig 2010. (Loseblattsammlung).

References

External links 
 Datenbank des Zentralinstituts für Kunstgeschichte, Deutschen Historischen Museums und Haus der Kunst mit Informationen zu allen ausgestellten Kunstwerken
 Das Haus der Deutschen Kunst 1937–1945 Ausführliche Darstellung des Themas, u. a. des Ausstellungskatalogs von 1940 und ca. 730 Werke auf Kunstpostkarten
 Virtuelle Rekonstruktion des Hauses der Deutschen Kunst 1937–1944 
 Lutz Walther, Arnulf Scriba: „Die Große Deutsche Kunstausstellung“ auf LeMO
 Besucherzahl 1942
 Digitalisierte Kataloge aller „Großen Deutschen Kunstausstellungen“ 1937–1944 auf arthistoricum.net
 

1940s
1930s
Events in Munich
Art exhibitions in Germany
Nazi culture
Nazi propaganda
Race-related controversies in art